Riverdale is a city in Clayton County, Georgia, United States. The population was 15,134 at the 2010 census, up from 12,478 in 2000. Riverdale is a suburb just south of Hartsfield–Jackson Atlanta International Airport and is part of the Atlanta metropolitan area.

History
The area now known as Riverdale was settled before the Civil War. Riverdale was founded in 1886, when the railroad was extended to that point.

In 1908, the city was incorporated with the name Riverdale, named in honor of Mr. W.S. Rivers, the original owner of the town site.

Geography

Demographics

2020 census

As of the 2020 United States census, there were 15,129 people, 5,517 households, and 3,404 families residing in the city.

2000 census
As of the census of 2000, there were 12,478 people, 4,389 households, and 3,107 families residing in the city. The racial makeup of the city was 20.09% White, 67.42% African American, 0.30% Native American, 7.73% Asian, 0.08% Pacific Islander, 2.28% from other races, and 2.10% from two or more races. Hispanic or Latino of any race were 4.81% of the population.

There were 4,389 households, out of which 44.6% had children under the age of 18 living with them, 39.3% were married couples living together, 25.2% had a female householder with no husband present, and 29.2% were non-families. 24.0% of all households were made up of individuals, and 3.3% had someone living alone who was 65 years of age or older.  The average household size was 2.80 and the average family size was 3.32.

In the city, the population was spread out, with 32.5% under the age of 18, 9.3% from 18 to 24, 36.1% from 25 to 44, 16.4% from 45 to 64, and 5.8% who were 65 years of age or older.  The median age was 30 years. For every 100 females, there were 87.4 males.  For every 100 females age 18 and over, there were 80.6 males.

The median income for a household in the city was $39,530, and the median income for a family was $42,323. Males had a median income of $30,802 versus $26,102 for females. The per capita income for the city was $15,377.  About 10.6% of families and 12.5% of the population were below the poverty line, including 14.0% of those under age 18 and 18.8% of those age 65 or over.

Politics

The city is governed by a mayor and four council members. Each council member represents the entire city and is elected at-large. Council members come from the four wards that divide the city. The mayor and council appoint a city manager, who has oversight over five departments.

Transportation

State highways

 Georgia State Route 85 (Clark Howell Memorial Hwy)
 Georgia State Route 138 (Martin Luther King Jr. Hwy)
 Georgia State Route 139 (Main St./Riverdale Rd.)
 Georgia State Route 314 (Fayetteville Rd., running west of the city limits)

Main roads
These are roads with more than four lanes.

Gardenwalk Boulevard
Lamar Hutcheson Parkway
Pointe South Parkway
Upper Riverdale Road

Minor roads
These are roads with two to four lanes. or other 785.

Church Street
Roberts Drive
Taylor Road
Valley Hill Road
Bethsaida Road
Helmer Road
Thomas Road
E. Fayetteville Road
Rountree Road
Roy Huie Road

Interstate highway
Interstate 75 passes northeast of the city limits.

Transit systems
Two MARTA bus routes serve the city, including:
Route 191 - Justice Center/Hartsfield Intl
Route 196 - Church/Upper Riverdale/Mt.Zion

Both of these routes connect the city to the College Park Station. Xpress GA commuter buses serve the city with Route 442

Education
Schools in Riverdale are in the Clayton County School System.

 Elementary
Anderson Elementary
Arnold Elementary
Brown Elementary
Callaway Elementary
Church Street Elementary
East Clayton Elementary
Edmonds Elementary
Fountain Elementary
Harper Elementary
Hawthorne Elementary
Haynie Elementary
Huie Elementary
Jackson Elementary
Kemp Elementary
Kemp Primary
Kilpatrick Elementary
Lake City Elementary
Lake Ridge Elementary
Lee Street Elementary
Marshall Elementary
Martin Luther King Jr. Elementary
McGarrah Elementary
Morrow Elementary
Mt. Zion Elementary
Mt. Zion Primary
Northcutt Elementary
Oliver Elementary
Pointe South Elementary
Riverdale Elementary
River's Edge Elementary
Smith Elementary
Suder Elementary
Swint Elementary
Tara Elementary
Unidos Dual Language Charter School
West Clayton Elementary
White Academy Elementary
Caterson Elementary

Middle
Adamson Middle School
Babb Middle School
Elite Scholars Academy
Forest Park Middle School
Jonesboro Middle School
Kendrick Middle School
Lovejoy Middle School
Morrow Middle School
Mundy's Mill Middle School
North Clayton Middle School
Pointe South Middle School
Rex Mill Middle School
Riverdale Middle School
Roberts Middle School 
Sequoyah Middle School
Utopian Academy for the Arts
White Academy

Education

High Schools
Charles Drew High School
Elite Scholars Academy
Fine Arts Magnet High School
Forest Park High School
Jonesboro High School
Lovejoy High School
Morrow High School
Mt. Zion High School
Mundy's Mill High School
North Clayton High School
Open Campus High School
Riverdale High School (Georgia)

Parks

The city currently has three parks, all within a mile of each other:
 Travon D. Wilson Memorial Park on Church St. behind the Merchant Shopping Center
 Church Park on Wilson Rd. behind the First Baptist Church of Riverdale
 Banks Park on Main St. and West St. next to city hall

Notable people
James Woodall, president of the Georgia NAACP
Sherrilyn Kenyon, author
DJ Shockley, football player
Edawn Coughman, football player
Will Rackley, NFL player
Cordy Glenn. NFL player
Ashley Holcombe, softball player
Cecil Travis, infielder, Washington Senators
Barry Loudermilk, U.S. Representative for Georgia's 11th District
Nina BoNina Brown, Drag Queen, appeared on Rupaul's Drag Race, Season 9
Devontae Cacok, NBA player
Playboi Carti, Rapper, Hip-Hop artist, 
 Waka Flocka Flame, Rapper, Hip-Hop artist
 Ciara, singer

References

External links
City of Riverdale official website

Cities in Georgia (U.S. state)
Cities in Clayton County, Georgia
I-785 like NC.